Norbury railway station is a National Rail station in the Norbury area of the London Borough of Croydon in south London. The station is operated by Southern, which also provides all train services. It is in Travelcard Zone 3 and Ticket barriers are in operation at this station.

History 
The Balham Hill and East Croydon line was constructed by the London, Brighton and South Coast Railway (LB&SCR) as a short-cut on the Brighton Main Line to London Victoria, avoiding Crystal Palace and Norwood Junction. It was opened on 1 December 1862. However, Norbury station was not opened until January 1878, for the surrounding area was very rural. The station was rebuilt in 1903 when the lines were quadrupled. In 1925 the lines were electrified.

Ticket gates were installed in 2009.

A nearby Victorian race track, dating from 1868, was situated in fields forming part of Lonesome Farm, which later became the sports ground of the National Westminster Bank (NatWest). The course, which included a water jump across the River Graveney, hosted the 'Streatham Races'. Race meetings attracted huge crowds of racegoers, bookies and other notorious characters, who flocked to the course by train.

Service 
All services at Norbury are operated by Southern using  EMUs.

The typical off-peak service in trains per hour is:
 2 tph to  via 
 2 tph to 
 1 tph to  via 
 3 tph to 
 2 tph to 

Connections
London Buses routes 50, 109 and 255 and night route N109 all serve Norbury station.

References

External links 

Railway stations in the London Borough of Croydon
Former London, Brighton and South Coast Railway stations
Railway stations in Great Britain opened in 1878
Railway stations served by Govia Thameslink Railway
1878 establishments in England